Young Medardus (German: Der junge Medardus) is a 1923 Austrian silent historical drama film directed by Michael Curtiz and starring Victor Varconi, Egon von Jordan and Agnes Esterhazy. Based on a play with the same name by Arthur Schnitzler, it is set during the 1809 French occupation of Vienna during the Napoleonic Wars.

It was shot at the Schönbrunn Studios in Vienna and on location in the city. The film's sets were designed by the art directors Artur Berger and Julius von Borsody.

Cast
 Victor Varconi as Medardus Klähr
 Egon von Jordan as Etzel
 Agnes Esterhazy as Helene
 Gyula Szőreghy as Eschenbacher
 Karel Lamač as Franz
 Franz Glawatsch as Berger
 Mari Hegyesi as Mrs. Klähr
 Anny Hornik as Agathe
 Josef König as Wachshuber
 Ferdinand Onno as Marquis de Valois
 Ludwig Rethey as Duke of Valois
 Mary Stone as Anna
 Mihail Xantho as Napoleon

See also
 Michael Curtiz filmography

References

Bibliography
 Von Dassanowsky, Robert. Austrian Cinema: A History. McFarland, 2005.

External links

1923 films
1920s historical drama films
Austrian silent feature films
Austrian black-and-white films
Austrian historical drama films
Films produced by Arnold Pressburger
Films set in the 1800s
Films set in Vienna
Films shot at Schönbrunn Studios
Films based on works by Arthur Schnitzler
Films directed by Michael Curtiz
Silent historical drama films
1920s German-language films